Tobiasson is a patronymic Swedish surname. Notable people with the surname include:

Andreas Tobiasson (born 1983), Swedish footballer
Ingrid Tobiasson (born 1951), Swedish opera singer

See also
Alex Tobiasson Harris

Swedish-language surnames
Patronymic surnames